Zagadki  is a village in the administrative district of Gmina Szczerców, within Bełchatów County, Łódź Voivodeship, in central Poland.

The village has a population of about 100.

References

Zagadki